Loch Bà is a shallow irregular shaped freshwater loch on Rannoch Moor, Argyll and Bute, in the Scottish West Highlands, within the Highland council area of Scotland. It is about 25 km east-south-east of Glen Coe, and 20 km north of Tyndrum.

There is a viewpoint on the east side of the A82 road which runs past the western end of the main loch.

Geography
Loch Bà is one of two primary lochs that sit in Rannoch Moor, lying southwest of Loch Beinn a' Mheadhoin. Both lochs are served by the River Affric. A number of smaller lochs surround Loch Affric. At the southwestern end sits Loch Coulavie located at the base An Tudair Beag and a slightly higher elevation. Also at the southwestern end, the River Affric flows into the tiny loch of Loch Na Camaig. At the northeastern side, both the lochs Loch-Pollan Fearne and Garbe-Uisage drain into Loch Affric.

References

Lochs of Highland (council area)
Freshwater lochs of Scotland
LBa
Lochs of Argyll and Bute
Lochaber